Fleming Field is a small village in County Durham, in England. It is situated between Peterlee and Durham, next to Shotton Colliery.

References

Villages in County Durham